The 1991 Australian Sports Sedan Championship was a CAMS sanctioned motor racing title open to Sports Sedans. It was the 7th Australian Sports Sedan Championship and the first to be awarded since 1981. The championship was won by Greg Crick driving a Honda Prelude Chevrolet.

Calendar
The championship was contested over a fourteen round series with one race per round.

Points system
Championship points were awarded on a 20-15-12-10-8-6-4-3-2-1 basis for the first ten places at each round.

Results

Note:
 The above table reflects the points awarded to each driver at each round as shown in Australian Motor Racing Year 1991/92 on pages 302 & 303. The final points listing shown on page 303 varies slightly from this.  
 There were only nine finishers at Rounds 9 and 10.
 Round 12 at Lakeside was stopped due to an accident and only half points were awarded.

References

National Sports Sedan Series
Sports Sedan Championship